Bo Janne Andreas Jakobsson (born 6 October 1972) is a Swedish former professional footballer who played as a defender and defensive midfielder. Starting off his professional career with Landskrona BoIS in 1990, he went on to also represent Helsingborgs IF, Hansa Rostock, Brøndby IF, and Southampton before retiring at Helsingborg in 2007. He played 36 international matches for the Sweden national team, and was a squad player at the 2002 FIFA World Cup and UEFA Euro 2004.

Club career
Born in Lund and raised in Teckomatorp, Jakobsson started his senior career as a central defender for nearby club Landskrona BoIS in 1990. He helped Landskrona win promotion for the top-flight Swedish Allsvenskan championship in 1993. Landskrona were relegated again following the 1994 Allsvenskan season, and Jakobsson moved on to Allsvenskan club Helsingborgs IF. He instantly commanded a place in Helsingborg's starting line-up, and made his debut for the Swedish national team in February 1996. Together with Ola Nilsson, he formed the strongest central defence in Allsvenskan for several years and in 1999, HIF was finally able to win Allsvenskan after 58 years of waiting. Without the solid defence controlled by Jakobsson, many doubt it would have been possible.

After winning the 1999 Allsvenskan championship with HIF, he moved abroad to play for Hansa Rostock in the Bundesliga in the summer 2000. He played three seasons at Rostock, missing only three of 102 league games for the club. In July 2003, Jakobsson left Rostock to play for Brøndby IF in the Danish Superliga.

He played five games in the 2004–05 Superliga, which Brøndby would go on to win, before moving to English club Southampton F.C. in the FA Premier League, scoring twice against Crystal Palace and Middlesbrough. At the end of the season, Southampton were relegated, and Jakobsson returned to play for Helsingborgs IF. After the 2007 season, he retired from professional football.

International career 
Jakobsson was called up for the Swedish squad for the 2002 FIFA World Cup, and played full-time in all four games for Sweden, replacing the injured captain Patrik Andersson.  He was selected to represent Sweden at the 2004 European Championship, and played full-time in the tournament, as Sweden reached the quarter-finals. He was a designated penalty taker in the penalty shoot out against the Netherlands, but refused to take his penalty. Instead, Olof Mellberg took a penalty which Dutch keeper Edwin van der Sar saved and Sweden were consequently eliminated. Jakobsson announced his retirement from international football after the tournament.

Career statistics

Club

International 

Scores and results list Sweden's goal tally first, score column indicates score after each Jakobsson goal.

Honours
Landskrona BoIS
 Division 1 Södra: 1993

Helsingborgs IF 
 Allsvenskan: 1999
 Svenska Cupen: 1997–98, 2006

Brøndby IF 
 Danish Superliga: 2004–05

References

External links 

Profile from the Swedish Football Association 
 Interview from Sportbladet 
 

Living people
1972 births
Association football defenders
2002 FIFA World Cup players
UEFA Euro 2004 players
Allsvenskan players
Landskrona BoIS players
Brøndby IF players
Danish Superliga players
Expatriate men's footballers in Denmark
Expatriate footballers in England
Expatriate footballers in Germany
FC Hansa Rostock players
Bundesliga players
Helsingborgs IF players
Premier League players
Southampton F.C. players
Swedish footballers
Sweden international footballers
Swedish expatriate footballers
Swedish expatriate sportspeople in Germany
Swedish expatriate sportspeople in Denmark
Swedish expatriate sportspeople in England
Sportspeople from Lund